Sledge is a surname. Notable people with the surname include:

Eugene Sledge (1923–2001), U.S. Marine, university professor, and author
James Scott Sledge (21st century), Chief Copyright Royalty Judge of the American Copyright Royalty Board
Joni Sledge (1956-2017), American singer
Joseph Sledge (1942–2020), American wrongly imprisoned prisoner
Kathy Sledge (born 1959), American singer
Percy Sledge (1940–2015), African-American rhythm and blues singer
Robert Sledge (born 1968), American double-bassist
Terrmel Sledge (born 1977), American baseball player

See also: Sister Sledge,  American musical vocal group